Naeem Ahmed Khan (born September 20, 1952 in Karachi, Sindh) is a former Pakistani cricketer who played one ODI in 1978.

References 

1952 births
Living people
Pakistan One Day International cricketers
Pakistani cricketers
Karachi Greens cricketers
Karachi Blues cricketers
Karachi Whites cricketers
Pakistan Universities cricketers
National Bank of Pakistan cricketers
Pakistan International Airlines cricketers
Pakistan International Airlines A cricketers
Punjab (Pakistan) cricketers
Sindh cricketers
Cricketers from Karachi